William Walter Maurice Keen (born 4 March 1970) is an English stage, television, and film actor. He has worked in theatre and television in both Britain and Spain. He was a trustee of the James Menzies Kitchin Award, an award set up for young theatre directors in memory of the director with whom Keen collaborated early in his career.

Early life
Keen was born in Oxford, the son of Charles William Lyle Keen and Lady Priscilla Mary Rose Curzon, daughter of Edward Curzon, 6th Earl Howe. His sisters are poet Alice Oswald and Laura Beatty. He studied at Eton College and has a first class degree in English literature from Oxford University.

Career
Some of his notable British theatre credits include Ghosts, Waste, Tom & Viv, Five Gold Rings, Patriots (Almeida Theatre), Huis Clos (Trafalgar Studios), Macbeth, The Changeling (Cheek by Jowl, Barbican and international tours), The Arsonists (Royal Court Theatre), Kiss of the Spider Woman (Donmar Warehouse), The Rubenstein Kiss (Hampstead Theatre), Hysteria, Don Juan, Man and Superman (Theatre Royal, Bath), Pericles, The Prince of Homburg (Lyric Hammersmith), The Duchess of Malfi, The Coast of Utopia, Mary Stuart, Hove (National Theatre), The Two Noble Kinsmen, The Tempest, The Winter's Tale, Dido, Queen of Carthage (Shakespeare's Globe), The Seagull, Present Laughter, The Tempest (West Yorkshire Playhouse), and Quartermaine's Terms, A Midsummer Night's Dream and Elton John's Glasses (West End).

His TV credits include Wolf Hall, The Musketeers, Midsomer Murders, Silk, Sherlock, The Impressionists, Wired, Casualty 1907, Elizabeth I, New Tricks, Titanic, Foyle's War, The Colour of Magic, and The Refugees. His film credits include Nine Lives of Tomas Katz and Love and Other Disasters.

In 2016, he played the role of the Queen's longtime Private Secretary, Michael Adeane, in the Netflix series The Crown. In 2019 he appeared in the BBC TV series His Dark Materials, based on the critically acclaimed book trilogy by Philip Pullman, as Father MacPhail (his daughter, Dafne, is the series' lead actress), whilst in 2021 he appeared as David Epstein in Ridley Road. In 2022, he played Vladimir Putin in the opening run of Peter Morgan's play Patriots, about the life of Russian oligarch Boris Berezovsky, at the Almeida Theatre in London.

In Spain, he has performed plays in Spanish, Traición (Betrayal) and Cuento de Invierno (The Winter's Tale) as well as directing Hamlet and Romeo y Julieta. In the musical field, he has recorded the "Seven Scenes from Hamlet" by the Spanish composer Benet Casablancas, in collaboration with the Orquesta de la Comunidad de Madrid, conducted by José Ramón Encinar (Stradivarius, 2010).

Personal life
He is married to Galician actress, theatre director, and writer Maria Fernandez Ache with whom he has a daughter, Dafne Keen, who is also an actress.

Filmography

Television

References

External links
 
 Interview with Theatre.com

Living people
1970 births
Alumni of the University of Oxford
English male dramatists and playwrights
English male Shakespearean actors
English male stage actors
English male television actors
Will
Male actors from Oxfordshire
People educated at Eton College